Cape Verdean Bissau-Guineans are Bissau-Guineans residents whose ancestry originated in Cape Verde.

As of 2007, the Instituto das Comunidades (Institute of the Communities) estimated that there were 2,000 people of Cape Verdean descent living in Guinea Bissau.  The majority of them lived in the capital city of Bissau and could trace their Cape Verdean roots to the island of Santiago.

Notable Guinea-Bissauan & Cape Verdean 
The most recognized in Cape Verdean Guinea-Bissauan include:
Amílcar Cabral, led the movement for Guinea Bissau & Cape Verdean independence with the PAIGC Party.
Luís Cabral, first president of Guinea-Bissau
Honório Barreto, first African governor of Guinea-Bissau, at the time known as Guine Portuguesa.
Carlos Lopes, assistant to Assistant Secretary-General and Director for Political Affairs in his Executive Office

See also
 Cape Verde–Guinea-Bissau relations

References

External links
Central Intelligence Agency.  "Guinea-Bissau."  The World Factbook.  Retrieved October 19, 2007.

Guinea-Bissau
Ethnic groups in Guinea-Bissau